Lymphadenopathy or adenopathy is a disease of the lymph nodes, in which they are abnormal in size or consistency. Lymphadenopathy of an inflammatory type (the most common type) is lymphadenitis,  producing swollen or enlarged lymph nodes. In clinical practice, the distinction between lymphadenopathy and lymphadenitis is rarely made and the words are usually treated as synonymous. Inflammation of the lymphatic vessels is known as lymphangitis. Infectious lymphadenitis affecting lymph nodes in the neck is often called scrofula.

Lymphadenopathy is a common and nonspecific sign. Common causes include infections (from minor causes such as the common cold and post-vaccination swelling to serious ones such as HIV/AIDS), autoimmune diseases, and cancer. Lymphadenopathy is frequently idiopathic and self-limiting.

Causes

Lymph node enlargement is recognized as a common sign of infectious, autoimmune, or malignant disease. Examples may include:
 Reactive: acute infection (e.g., bacterial, or viral), or chronic infections (tuberculous lymphadenitis, cat-scratch disease).
 The most distinctive sign of bubonic plague is extreme swelling of one or more lymph nodes that bulge out of the skin as "buboes." The buboes often become necrotic and may even rupture.
 Infectious mononucleosis is an acute viral infection usually caused by Epstein-Barr virus and may be characterized by a marked enlargement of the cervical lymph nodes.
 It is also a sign of cutaneous anthrax and Human African trypanosomiasis
 Toxoplasmosis, a parasitic disease, gives a generalized lymphadenopathy (Piringer-Kuchinka lymphadenopathy).
 Plasma cell variant of Castleman's disease - associated with HHV-8 infection and HIV infection
 Mesenteric lymphadenitis after viral systemic infection (particularly in the GALT in the appendix) can commonly present like appendicitis.
Infectious causes of lymphadenopathy may include bacterial infections such as cat scratch disease, tularemia, brucellosis, or prevotella, as well as fungal infections such as paracoccidioidomycosis.
 Tumoral:
 Primary: Hodgkin lymphoma and non-Hodgkin lymphoma give lymphadenopathy in all or a few lymph nodes.
 Secondary: metastasis, Virchow's Node, neuroblastoma, and chronic lymphocytic leukemia.
 Autoimmune: systemic lupus erythematosus and rheumatoid arthritis may have a generalized lymphadenopathy.
 Immunocompromised: AIDS. Generalized lymphadenopathy is an early sign of infection with human immunodeficiency virus (HIV), the virus that causes acquired immunodeficiency syndrome (AIDS).  "Lymphadenopathy syndrome" has been used to describe the first symptomatic stage of HIV progression, preceding a diagnosis of AIDS.
 Bites from certain venomous snakes such as the pit viper
 Unknown: Kikuchi disease, progressive transformation of germinal centers, sarcoidosis, hyaline-vascular variant of Castleman's disease, Rosai-Dorfman disease, Kawasaki disease, Kimura disease

Benign (reactive) lymphadenopathy
 lymphadenopathy is a common biopsy finding, and may often be confused with malignant lymphoma. It may be separated into major morphologic patterns, each with its own differential diagnosis with certain types of lymphoma. Most cases of reactive follicular hyperplasia are easy to diagnose, but some cases may be confused with follicular lymphoma. There are seven distinct patterns of benign lymphadenopathy:
 Follicular hyperplasia: This is the most common type of reactive lymphadenopathy.
 Paracortical hyperplasia/Interfollicular hyperplasia: It is seen in viral infections, skin diseases, and nonspecific reactions.
 Sinus histiocytosis: It is seen in lymph nodes draining limbs, inflammatory lesions, and malignancies.
 Nodal extensive necrosis
 Nodal granulomatous inflammation
 Nodal extensive fibrosis (Connective tissue framework)
 Nodal deposition of interstitial substance

These morphological patterns are never pure. Thus, reactive follicular hyperplasia can have a component of paracortical hyperplasia. However, this distinction is important for the differential diagnosis of the cause.

Diagnosis

In cervical lymphadenopathy (of the neck),  it is routine to perform a throat examination including the use of a mirror and an endoscope.

On ultrasound, B-mode imaging depicts lymph node morphology, whilst power Doppler can assess the vascular pattern. B-mode imaging features that can distinguish metastasis and lymphoma include size, shape, calcification, loss of hilar architecture, as well as intranodal necrosis. Soft tissue edema and nodal matting on B-mode imaging suggests tuberculous cervical lymphadenitis or previous radiation therapy. Serial monitoring of nodal size and vascularity are useful in assessing treatment response.

Fine needle aspiration cytology (FNAC) has sensitivity and specificity percentages of 81% and 100%, respectively, in the histopathology of malignant cervical lymphadenopathy. PET-CT has proven to be helpful in identifying occult primary carcinomas of the head and neck, especially when applied as a guiding tool prior to panendoscopy, and may induce treatment related clinical decisions in up to 60% of cases.

Classification
Lymphadenopathy may be classified by:
 Size, where lymphadenopathy in adults is often defined as a short axis of one or more lymph nodes is greater than 10mm.
 By extent:
 Localized lymphadenopathy: due to localized spot of infection e.g., an infected spot on the scalp will cause lymph nodes in the neck on that same side to swell up

 Generalized lymphadenopathy: due to a systemic infection of the body e.g., influenza or secondary syphilis
 Persistent generalized lymphadenopathy (PGL): persisting for a long time, possibly without an apparent cause
 By localization:
 Hilar lymphadenopathy.
 Mediastinal lymphadenopathy
 Bilateral hilar lymphadenopathy
 Dermatopathic lymphadenopathy: lymphadenopathy associated with skin disease.
 By malignancy: Benign lymphadenopathy is distinguished from malignant types which mainly refer to lymphomas or lymph node metastasis.

Size

 By size, where lymphadenopathy in adults is often defined as a short axis of one or more lymph nodes is greater than 10mm. However, there is regional variation as detailed in this table:

Lymphadenopathy of the axillary lymph nodes can be defined as solid nodes measuring more than 15 mm without fatty hilum. Axillary lymph nodes may be normal up to 30 mm if consisting largely of fat.

In children, a short axis of 8 mm can be used. However, inguinal lymph nodes of up to 15 mm and cervical lymph nodes of up to 20 mm are generally normal in children up to age 8–12.

Lymphadenopathy of more than 1.5–2 cm increases the risk of cancer or granulomatous disease as the cause rather than only inflammation or infection. Still, an increasing size and persistence over time are more indicative of cancer.

See also
 Adenitis
 Lymphovascular invasion

References

External links
 HPC:13820 on humpath.com (Digital slides)

Cytopathology
Inflammations
Diseases of veins, lymphatic vessels and lymph nodes